Suối Nghệ is a commune (xã) and village in Châu Đức District, Bà Rịa–Vũng Tàu province, in Vietnam. The village was built by engineers from the 1st Australian Civil Affairs Unit in September 1967, during the Vietnam War, as a resettlement village. A total of 1132 persons, comprising 246 families from three villages which were under Viet Cong influence were resettled here.

References

Populated places in Bà Rịa-Vũng Tàu province
Communes of Bà Rịa-Vũng Tàu province